Bill Arnold is a former member of the Arizona House of Representatives from January 2003 until January 2005. He was elected to the House in November 2002, representing the newly aligned District 12, after redistricting. In 2004, Arnold ran for re-election, but lost in the Republican primary to Jerry Weiers.

References

Republican Party members of the Arizona House of Representatives
Living people
Year of birth missing (living people)